The Pirate Party is a political party in Iceland. The party's platform is based on pirate politics and direct democracy.

History

The Icelandic Pirate Party was founded on 24 November 2012 by Smári McCarthy and several Internet activists, including Birgitta Jónsdóttir (previously a member of the Movement).
The party successfully applied for the ballot list letter Þ (resembling the party's logo) in order to run in the 2013 election. In July 2016, the party requested and was issued the letter P for future elections.

In their first electoral participation, at the 2013 parliamentary election, the Pirate Party won 5.1% of the votes, just above the 5% threshold required to win representation in the Althing. The three members elected, Birgitta Jónsdóttir, Helgi Hrafn Gunnarsson, and Jón Þór Ólafsson, were the first pirates elected to any national legislature in the world.

Following the Charlie Hebdo shooting on 7 January 2015, the Pirate Party began a campaign to repeal Iceland's blasphemy laws. The laws, which had been introduced in 1940, were successfully repealed in early July 2015. The repeal, introduced by the Pirate Party, read: "Freedom of expression is one of the cornerstones of democracy. It is fundamental to a free society that people should be able to express themselves without fear of punishment, whether from the authorities or from other people". During the vote on the repeal, the three Pirate Party members of the Althing stood and declared "Je suis Charlie", in solidarity with the French satirical magazine.

For around a year from April 2015 to April 2016, the party consistently topped polling for the next Icelandic parliamentary election in 2016, with support roughly equal to the Independence Party and the Progressive Party combined, who were at the time partners in a coalition government.

An MMR opinion poll published in January 2016 put their public support at 37.8%, significantly above that of all other Icelandic political parties.

In April 2016, public protests about the Prime Minister's role in the Panama Papers brought out a significant percentage of the whole population, and may have been among "the largest demonstrations of any kind, in any country, ever (proportionately speaking)". In the wake of the Panama Papers scandal, polls in April 2016 showed the Pirate Party at 43% and the Independence Party at 21.6%.

A poll by the Social Science Research Institute of the University of Iceland with data from 1419 October 2016 put the Pirate Party in first place in the general election on the 29 October 2016 with 22.6% of the vote.

The party significantly underperformed in the election. While they saw a major increase in vote-share and seats, they finished in third place behind the Independence Party and Left-Greens with 14.5% of the vote; almost a third of what some had polls shown at the beginning of the year.

In the 2017 election held a year later, the Pirates fell to sixth place, winning 9.2% of the vote and losing four seats. The Pirates held pat in the 2021 election, winning six seats and remaining in sixth position.

Recent issue stances

European Union

The party has not officially taken a position in favour of or against Iceland's accession to the European Union. The party has however concluded the following in a party policy on the European Union:
 Iceland must never become a member of the European Union unless the membership agreement is put to a referendum after having been presented to the nation in an impartial manner.
 Should Iceland join the European Union, the country shall be a single constituency in elections to the European Parliament.
 Should Iceland join the European Union, Icelandic shall be one of its official languages.
 If negotiations on the accession of Iceland to the European Union halt, or membership is rejected by either party, a review of the agreement on the European Economic Area must be sought, to better ensure Iceland's self-determination. It is unacceptable that Iceland need to take up large part of European legislation through a business agreement without getting representatives or audience.
 The conditions of Pirates for Iceland's membership to the European Union are that Iceland be exempt from adopting the Data Retention Directive (2006/24/EC – declared invalid by the European Court of Justice in April 2014) and the regulation regarding enforcement of uncontested claims (1869/2005/EC), which would otherwise defy fundamental human rights.

Edward Snowden

On 4 July 2013, a bill was introduced in parliament that would, if passed, immediately grant Edward Snowden Icelandic citizenship. The proposer of the bill was Helgi Hrafn Gunnarsson (Pirate Party) and it was co-sponsored by the other Pirate Party parliament members, Ögmundur Jónasson (Left-Green Movement), Páll Valur Björnsson (Bright Future) and Helgi Hjörvar (Social Democratic Alliance). A vote was taken to determine whether the bill would be put on parliament's agenda but it did not receive enough support.

Other
The party stated in its 2021 policy agenda that it wants to in the future tranistion the government support structure towards an unconditional basic income. The party also stated its support for harm reduction and the decriminalisation of drug use, instead focusing on building support systems for those with problems and housing homeless addicts.

Electoral results

Parliament

Municipalities

Akureyri Town

Árborg Municipality
The currently elected representative is Álfheiður Eymarsdóttir.

* Áfram Árborg, joint candidature with Reform Party.

Hafnarfjörður Town

Ísafjörður Town

Kópavogur Town
The currently elected representative is Sigurbjörg Erla Egilsdóttir.

Mosfellsbær Town

* Joint candidature with Íbúahreyfingin.

Reykjanes Town

Reykjavík City
The currently elected representatives are Dóra Björt Guðjónsdóttir, Alexandra Briem and Magnús Davíð Norðdahl.

Notes

Further reading

 Silja Bára Ómarsdóttir & Viktor Orri Valgarðsson (2020) "Anarchy in Iceland? The global left, pirates and socialists in post-crash Icelandic politics." Globalizations.

References

External links
 Official website in Icelandic: https://piratar.is
 Official website in English: https://piratar.is/english/
 Manifesto for 2016 parliamentary elections in Iceland: http://piratar.is/en/election-manifesto-2016/
 

2012 establishments in Iceland
Iceland
Political parties established in 2012
Political parties in Iceland
Political parties supporting universal basic income
Direct democracy parties